C. Guy Stephenson (February 15, 1901 – January 28, 1998) was an American football, basketball and baseball coach. He served as the head football coach at Middle Tennessee State University in Murfreesboro, Tennessee from 1924 to 1925, as well as serving as the school's head men's basketball coach (1924–1926) and baseball coach (1925–1926).

Head coaching record

Football

References

1901 births
1998 deaths
American football centers
Middle Tennessee Blue Raiders baseball coaches
Middle Tennessee Blue Raiders football coaches
Middle Tennessee Blue Raiders men's basketball coaches
Tennessee Volunteers football players
People from Centerville, Tennessee
Coaches of American football from Tennessee
Players of American football from Tennessee
Baseball coaches from Tennessee
Basketball coaches from Tennessee